List of acts who appeared on the television show American Bandstand.



0-9
The 13th Floor Elevators
1910 Fruitgum Company
20/20
The 5th Dimension
9.9

A

a-ha
Willie Aames
ABBA
Gregory Abbott
ABC
Adam and the Ants
Bryan Adams
Aerosmith
Alabama
All Sports Band
The Alarm
Deborah Allen
The Animals
Paul Anka
Ann-Margret
Susan Anton
Adam Ant
Aerosmith
America
Animotion
Ashford & Simpson
The Association
Christopher Atkins
Atlantic Starr
Patti Austin
Autograph
Frankie Avalon
Angel

B

The Babys
Bachman–Turner Overdrive
Badfinger
Philip Bailey
Baltimora
Scott Baio
Anita Baker
Joby Baker
LaVern Baker
Marty Balin
Bananarama
The Bangles
Len Barry
Toni Basil
Fontella Bass
Bay City Rollers
Berlin
The Beach Boys
Beastie Boys
The Beatles (on video not live)
The Beat
The Beau Brummels
Bee Gees
Pat Benatar
Robby Benson
Tony Bennett
Barbi Benton
Chuck Berry
Elvin Bishop
Stephen Bishop
Big Country
Jack Blanchard & Misty Morgan
Blancmange
The Blasters
Blondie
Bloodstone
Kurtis Blow
The Blow Monkeys
Blue Cheer
The BoDeans
Michael Bolton
The Boomtown Rats
Bon Jovi
Danny Bonaduce
Gary U.S. Bonds
Debby Boone
Pat Boone
Bourgeois Tagg
David Bowie
Jimmy Boyd
Bow Wow Wow
The Boys
The Brady Bunch Kids (Barry Williams, Maureen McCormick, Christopher Knight, Susan Olsen, Eve Plumb and Mike Lookinland)
Laura Branigan
Bob Braun (also guest-hosted)
Brass Construction
Bread
Brick
Alicia Bridges
Johnny Bristol
The Brooklyn Bridge 
Brooklyn Dreams
The Brothers Johnson
James Brown
James Brown & The Famous Flames
Peter Brown
Anita Bryant
Bubble Puppy
The Buckinghams
Buckner & Garcia
Buffalo Springfield
Solomon Burke
Johnny Burnette
Rocky Burnette
George Burns
The Busboys
The Byrds
Edd Byrnes

C

John Cafferty & The Beaver Brown Band
Jonathan Cain
Bobby Caldwell
Glen Campbell
Cannibal & the Headhunters
Freddy Cannon (holds the record for most appearances at 110)
Captain & Tennille
Irene Cara
Carl Carlton
Eric Carmen
Kim Carnes
The Carpenters
Belinda Carlisle
Bill Carroll
Mel Carter
Johnny Cash
Rosanne Cash
David Cassidy
Shaun Cassidy
Boomer Castleman
The Chairmen of the Board
Champaign
The Champs
Harry Chapin
Charlene
Charles Wright & the Watts 103rd Street Rhythm Band
Charo
Cheech & Chong
Cher
Cherrelle
The Chi-Lites
Chubby Checker
Chic
Chilliwack
The Chordettes
Lou Christie
Wang Chung
Jimmy Clanton
Roy Clark
Patsy Cline
The Coasters
Eddie Cochran
Natalie Cole
Judy Collins
The Commodores
Perry Como
Con Funk Shun
Sam Cooke
Coven
The Cover Girls
The Cowsills
Billy "Crash" Craddock
Creedence Clearwater Revival
Marshall Crenshaw
The Crests
Jim Croce
Crowded House
The Crystals
Culture Club
Burton Cummings
Andre Cymone
The Classics IV

D

Dick Dale
Vic Damone
Ron Dante
E.G. Daily
Michael Damian
Danny and the Juniors
Bobby Darin
James Darren
Mac Davis
Paul Davis (singer)
Skeeter Davis
Tyrone Davis
Bobby Day
Taylor Dayne
The Dazz Band
Jimmy Dean
DeBarge
Rick Dees
Def Leppard
The DeFranco Family
The Delfonics
The Del-Vikings
The Dells
The Delicates
Jackie DeShannon
Devo
Neil Diamond
The Diamonds
Dick and Dee Dee
Dino, Desi & Billy
Dion and the Belmonts
Dion DiMucci (solo)
Disco-Tex and the Sex-O-Lettes
Dokken
Dolenz, Jones, Boyce & Hart
Fats Domino
Troy Donahue
Bo Donaldson and The Heywoods
Donovan
The Doors
Ronnie Dove
The Dovells
Lamont Dozier
The Dramatics
The Dream Academy
The Drifters
Dr. Hook
Dr. John
Tony Dow
George Duke
Robbie Dupree

E
Sheila E.
Sheena Easton
Billy Eckstine
Duane Eddy
Dave Edmunds
Dennis Edwards
Electric Light Orchestra
Yvonne Elliman
Cass Elliot
The Emotions
England Dan & John Ford Coley
The English Beat
Eric Martin Band
David Essex
Eternity's Children
Betty Everett
The Everly Brothers
Exposé
B.T. Express

F

Shelley Fabares
Fabian
The Fabulous Thunderbirds
Adam Faith
Falco
Fanny
Jose Feliciano
Kim Fields
Firefall
Five Man Electrical Band
The Five Satins
Five Star
The Fixx
The Flamingos
Flash Cadillac & the Continental Kids
Mick Fleetwood's Zoo
The Fleshtones
The Flirts
The Floaters
A Flock of Seagulls
Tom Fogerty
The Four Coins
The Four Lads
The Four Preps
The Four Seasons
Four Tops
Tennessee Ernie Ford
Peter Frampton
Connie Francis
Franke and the Knockouts
Aretha Franklin
Bobby Freeman
The Frogmen
Annette Funicello
Harvey Fuqua & The Moonglows
Richie Furay

G

The Gap Band
Leif Garrett
Siedah Garrett
Kathy Garver
Kelly Groucutt
Gary's Gang
Marvin Gaye
Crystal Gayle
Gloria Gaynor
The J. Geils Band
The Georgia Satellites
Andy Gibb
George Baker Selection
General Public
Georgia Gibbs
Debbie Gibson
Nick Gilder
Giuffria
Go West
The Go-Go's
Golden Earring
Lesley Gore
Robert Goulet
Larry Graham
Eddy Grant
The Grass Roots
Dobie Gray
Cyndi Grecco
Buddy Greco
Al Green
Norman Greenbaum
Rosey Grier
Merv Griffin
Larry Groce
GTR
The Guess Who
Gunhill Road (season 16, episode 32, aired June 9, 1973)

H

Hair (entire cast)
Haircut One Hundred
Bill Haley & His Comets
Hall & Oates
Hamilton, Joe Frank & Reynolds
Albert Hammond
Wayne Handy
Slim Harpo
Corey Hart
Ritchie Hart (aka Charlie Gearheart)
Dan Hartman
Dale Hawkins
Isaac Hayes
The Edwin Hawkins Singers
Justin Hayward
Robert Hazard
Joey Heatherton
Heaven 17
Bobby Helms
Clarence "Frogman" Henry
Patrick Hernandez
Howard Hewett
Roger Hodgson
Amy Holland
The Hollies
Buddy Holly and the Crickets
Rupert Holmes
Honey Cone
Thelma Houston
Miki Howard
The Hudson Brothers
The Hues Corporation
Huey Lewis and the News
Brian Hyland
The Huns

I
The Icicle Works
Billy Idol
The Impressions
Incredible Bongo Band
Information Society
James Ingram
INXS
Iron Butterfly
Isley-Jasper-Isley

J

Terry Jacks
The Jackson 5
Freddie Jackson
Janet Jackson
Jermaine Jackson
Joe Jackson
La Toya Jackson
Marlon Jackson
Michael Jackson
Wanda Jackson
The Jaggerz
The Jam
Etta James
Joni James
Rick James
Sonny James
Tommy James
Jan and Dean
Miles Jaye
The Jaynetts
Jefferson Airplane
Jefferson Starship
Jellybean Benitez
The Jets
John Fred & His Playboy Band
Robert John
Sammy Johns
Johnny and the Hurricanes
Davy Jones
Grace Jones
Howard Jones
Jack Jones
The Jordan Brothers
The Junkyard Dog

K
Katrina and the Waves
Kalin Twins
Kitty Kallen
KC and the Sunshine Band
Eddie Kendricks
Rufus featuring Chaka Khan
The Greg Kihn Band
Andy Kim
B.B. King
Ben E. King
Evelyn 'Champagne' King
The Kings
Kiss
Gladys Knight & the Pips
Jean Knight
Kool & the Gang

L

LL Cool J
Labelle
Lady Pank
Lakeside
Major Lance
Cyndi Lauper
Vicki Lawrence
Brenda Lee
Peggy Lee
Julian Lennon
Lenny and the Squigtones (Michael McKean and David Lander)
Level 42
LeVert 
Jerry Lee Lewis
Mark Lindsay
Lisa Lisa & Cult Jam
Little Anthony and the Imperials
Little Eva
Little Richard
Little River Band
Little Willie John
Lobo
The Lockers
Loggins & Messina
Looking Glass
Trini Lopez
Donna Loren
Los Lobos
Love
Darlene Love
Mike Love
Love Unlimited Orchestra
Loverboy
The Lovin' Spoonful
Nick Lowe
L.T.D.
Lulu
Frankie Lymon and the Teenagers

M

Mary MacGregor
Madonna
Madness
The Main Ingredient
The Mamas & the Papas
Henry Mancini
The Manhattan Transfer
The Manhattans 
Barry Manilow
Herbie Mann
Hal March
Benny Mardones
Teena Marie
Al Martino
The Marvelettes
Dave Mason
Richard Marx
Mary Jane Girls
Johnny Mathis
Curtis Mayfield
Maze
C. W. McCall
Marilyn McCoo and Billy Davis Jr.
Gwen McCrae
Jimmy McCracklin
McFadden and Whitehead
Maureen McGovern
The McGuire Sisters
Don McLean
Christine McVie
Melissa Manchester
Bill Medley
Melanie
John Mellencamp
The Mello-Kings
Harold Melvin & the Blue Notes
Men at Work
Sérgio Mendes
Miami Sound Machine
Mickey & Sylvia
Midnight Star
The Mike Curb Congregation
Mike + The Mechanics
Jody Miller
Roger Miller
Stephanie Mills
Ronnie Milsap
Sal Mineo
The Miracles
Molly Hatchet
Eddie Money
Van Morrison
The Motels
Alison Moyet
The Monkees
Chris Montez
Mr. Mister
Mrs. Miller
Martin Mull
Walter Murphy

N

Naked Eyes
The Natural Four
Johnny Nash
David Naughton
Mike Nesmith
Robbie Nevil
New Edition
New Seekers
Juice Newton
Wayne Newton
Maxine Nightingale
Night Ranger
Leonard Nimoy
The Nitty Gritty Dirt Band
Kenny Nolan
Nu Shooz

O

John O'Banion
Billy Ocean
The Ohio Players
Oingo Boingo
Oliver
Nigel Olsson
Roy Orbison
Orchestral Manoeuvres in the Dark
Alexander O'Neal
Tony Orlando and Dawn
Jeffrey Osborne
Donny Osmond
Marie Osmond
The Osmonds
The Outfield

P

Pablo Cruise
Patti Page
Robert Palmer
Ray Parker Jr.
John Parr
The Partland Brothers
Dolly Parton
Billy Paul
Paul Petersen
Freda Payne
Peaches & Herb
Pebbles
People!
The People's Choice
Peppermint Rainbow
Peter, Paul & Mary
Bernadette Peters
Phantom, Rocker & Slick
Jim Photoglo
Bobby "Boris" Pickett
Pink Floyd
Gene Pitney
The Platters
Player
Poco
The Pointer Sisters
Bonnie Pointer
Pratt & McClain
Billy Preston
Pretty Poison
Prime Time
Prince
The Psychedelic Furs
Public Image Ltd.
Gary Puckett & The Union Gap
Pure Prairie League

Q
Quarterflash
Question Mark and the Mysterians
The Quin-Tones

R

Eddie Rabbitt
The Raes
Tony Randall
The Raspberries
Rare Earth
Lou Rawls
Johnnie Ray
Susan Raye
Raydio
Real Life
Redbone
Otis Redding
Helen Reddy
Redeye
Red Rider
Della Reese
Regina
The Reflections
R.E.M.
Martha Reeves and the Vandellas
REO Speedwagon
Paul Revere and the Raiders
Cliff Richard
Little Richard
Lionel Richie
The Righteous Brothers
Jeannie C. Riley
Minnie Riperton
Rodney Allen Rippy
Johnny Rivers
Smokey Robinson
Smokey Robinson and The Miracles
Vicki Sue Robinson
Rockpile
Rockwell
Jimmie Rodgers
Tommy Roe
Fred Rogers
Kenny Rogers
Roy Rogers and Dale Evans
Romeo Void
The Romantics
Don Rondo
The Ronettes
Linda Ronstadt
The Rose Garden
Rose Royce
The Rubinoos
David Ruffin
Jimmy Ruffin
Rufus featuring Chaka Khan
Run-D.M.C.
Jennifer Rush
Merrilee Rush
Patrice Rushen
Bobby Rydell
Mitch Ryder

S

Buffy Sainte-Marie
Sam & Dave
Evie Sands
Tommy Sands
Samantha Sang
Larry Santos
Scandal
Peter Schilling
Timothy B. Schmit
Freddie Scott
Scritti Politti
John Sebastian
Neil Sedaka
Michael Sembello
Sha Na Na
Shalamar
Tommy Shaw
The Seeds
Ravi Shankar
Shannon
Sa-Fire
Sweet Sensation
Jules Shear
Del Shannon
Feargal Sharkey
Dee Dee Sharp
Bobby Sherman
The Shirelles
Dinah Shore
The Short Cuts (Margy and Mary Ellen Keegan)
Richard Simmons
Joe Simon
Paul Simon and Art Garfunkel
Simple Minds
Sir Douglas Quintet
Slade
Sister Sledge
Grace Slick
Somethin' Smith and the Redheads
Bert Sommer
Sonny and Cher
Jimmy Soul 
The Soul Train Gang
J.D. Souther
Sparks
Ronnie Spector (with Eddie Money)
The Spinners
The Spiral Starecase
Split Enz
The Spokesmen
Dusty Springfield
Rick Springfield
Squeeze
Frank Stallone
The Staple Singers
Edwin Starr
Candi Staton 
Steely Dan
Steppenwolf
Connie Stevens
Ray Stevens
Stephen Stills
Jermaine Stewart
Stonebolt
Stories
Strawberry Alarm Clock
The Stray Cats
Steam
Stryper
The Sugarhill Gang
Sugarloaf
Donna Summer (co-hosted on May 27, 1978)
The Supremes
Keith Sweat
Sweetwater
Swing Out Sister
The Sylvers
Sylvester

T

Talking Heads
A Taste of Honey
Tavares
James Taylor
Johnnie Taylor
Livingston Taylor
Tears for Fears
The Temptations
B.J. Thomas
Carla Thomas
Rufus Thomas
Three Dog Night
Thompson Twins
George Thorogood & the Destroyers
Tierra
Tiffany
'Til Tuesday
Johnny Tillotson
The Time
Mel Tormé
The Toys
Joey Travolta
John Travolta
Tanya Tucker
Ike and Tina Turner
The Turtles
Tommy Tutone
Dwight Twilley
The Twisters
Conway Twitty
Bonnie Tyler

U
UB40
Leslie Uggams
Underground Sunshine
The Undisputed Truth

V

Jerry Vale
Ritchie Valens
Frankie Valli
Luther Vandross
Vanity (Denise Matthews)
Vanity 6
Gino Vannelli
Sarah Vaughan
Bobby Vee
The Ventures
Billy Vera and The Beaters
The Village People
Gene Vincent & His Blue Caps
Bobby Vinton
The Virtues
Vito and the Salutations

W

Wadsworth Mansion
Jack Wagner
John Waite
Junior Walker & the All-Stars
Wall of Voodoo
War
Anita Ward
Jennifer Warnes
Dionne Warwick
Jody Watley
Don Wayne
We Five
The Weather Girls
Bob Welch
Cory Wells
Mary Wells
Wham!
What Is This?
The Whispers
Johnny Whitaker
Barry White
Wild Cherry
Eugene Wilde
Matthew Wilder
Andy Williams
Billy Williams
Deniece Williams
Bruce Willis
Al Wilson
Carl Wilson
Jackie Wilson
Wire Train
Bill Withers
Bobby Womack
Stevie Wonder
Brenton Wood
Tom Wopat
Link Wray
Dale Wright and the Rock-Its
Gary Wright
Syreeta Wright

X
X

Y
Timi Yuro
"Weird Al" Yankovic
Yarbrough and Peoples
Paul Young
Y&T

References

American Bandstand